Clube Balonmán Atlético Guardés, also known as Mecalia Atlético Guardés due to sponsorship reasons is a handball club from A Guarda, in the province of Pontevedra, Spain. The club was founded in 1967 and plays actually in the  División de Honor Femenina de Balonmano, the premier women's professional handball league in Spain.

Season to season

History 
The club was promoted in 2012 to the División de Honor. In 2013-2014, the club plays his first continental competition, the EHF Cup Winners' Cup. In three participations, they always stopped their campaign in Round 3. In 2016-2017, they reach quarterfinals in the EHF Challenge Cup, beaten by H 65 Höör.

In 2016-2017 won their first spanish championship.

Trophies
 División de Honor: 1
2016–17

European record

Team

Current squad 

Squad for the 2020–21 season

Goalkeepers
 12  Marisol Carratu
 16  Miriam Sempere
Wingers
LW
 10  Lorena Pérez 
 79  Laura Morais
RW
 88  Daniela Moreno
 22  Rosario Urban 
Line players
 4  África Sempere Herrera
 25  Sarah Valero 
 26  Carla Gómez Suau

Back players
LB
 23  Paula Arcos
 5  Sandra Santiago
 20  Cristina Barbosa
CB
 7  Martina Mazza
 19  Patricia Lima 
 74  Erika Rajnohová
RB
 13  Estefanía Descalzo
 17  Paulina Pérez Buforn

Transfers
''Transfers for the 2020-2021

Joining
  Miriam Sempere
  Erika Rajnohová
  Paula Arcos
  Daniela Moreno

Leaving
  Carmen Campos (LB) - JDA Dijon (FRA)
  Sara Bravo (RW) - Clínicas Rincón Fertilidad Málaga (ESP)
  Meriem Ezbida (GK) - Liberbank Gijón (ESP)

Notable players 

  Vanesa Amorós
  Nuria Benzal
  Marisol Carratu
  Paula García Ávila
  Jennifer Gutiérrez
  Anna Manaut
  Carmen Martín
  Luciana Mendoza
  Haridian Rodríguez

References

External links
 
EHF Profil

Spanish handball clubs
Sports teams in Galicia (Spain)
Province of Pontevedra
Handball clubs established in 1967